Ardozyga mesopsamma is a species of moth in the family Gelechiidae. It was described by Turner in 1919. It is found in Australia, where it has been recorded from Queensland.

The forewings are dark fuscous with slight whitish irroration and whitish-brown markings. There is a broad costal streak from the base to one-third and a fine short sub-basal dorsal streak, as well as a series of fine dots on the apical third of the costa and termen. The hindwings are pale-grey.

References

Ardozyga
Moths described in 1919
Moths of Australia